The 1978–79 Segunda División B was the 2nd season of Segunda División B, the third highest level of the Spanish football league system, since its establishment in 1977. First and 2nd in each group were promoted to Segunda División, and the bottom three were relegated to the Tercera División.

Group 1

A total of 20 teams will contest the group, including 2 relegated from the Segunda División and 3 promoted from the Tercera División.

Promotion and relegation
Teams relegated from 1977–78 Segunda División
 Real Oviedo
 CD Tenerife
Teams promoted from 1977–78 Tercera División
 Zamora CF
 CD Logroñés
 CD Lugo

Teams
Teams from Aragon, Asturias, Basque Provinces, Canary Islands, Galicia, León, New Castile and Old Castile.

League table

Results

Top goalscorers

Top goalkeepers

Group 2

A total of 20 teams will contest the group, including 3 relegated from the Segunda División and 17 promoted from the Tercera División.

Promotion and relegation
Teams relegated from 1977–78 Segunda División
 CF Calvo Sotelo
 Córdoba CF
Teams promoted from 1977–78 Tercera División
 Gimnástico de Tarragona
 SD Ibiza
 CP Cacereño

Teams
Teams from Andalusia, Balearic Islands, Catalonia, Extremadura, New Castile and Valencia.

League table

Results

Top goalscorers

Top goalkeepers

External links
 RFEF Site

Segunda División B seasons
3
Spain